New Islington is a tram stop on the East Manchester Line (EML) and Zone 1 of Greater Manchester's light-rail Metrolink system. The station opened on 11 February 2013, after a three-day free trial for local residents. The station was constructed as part of Phase 3a of the Metrolink's expansion, and is located in the New Islington area of Manchester, England. It was originally proposed to open with the name Pollard Street, being located at the junction Munday Street and Pollard Street.

Services
Services are mostly every 12 minutes on all routes.

Connecting bus routes
New Islington is directly served by a bus service, which is served by Stagecoach Manchester service 216, which replicates the Metrolink service to Droylsden before continuing to Ashton-under-Lyne, and Stagecoach service 231, which runs nearby to Ashton via Littlemoss and Smallshaw. Both services run to nearby Piccadilly Gardens in Manchester.

References

External links

New Islington Stop Information
New Islington area map
 Light Rail Transit Association

Tram stops in Manchester
Tram stops on the Bury to Ashton-under-Lyne line